The 2008 Kansas City Wizards season was the 13th in Major League Soccer and the first season played at the temporary home CommunityAmerica Ballpark in Kansas City, Kansas. This marked the start of club's longstanding relationship with the city of Kansas City, Kansas, as the eventual new stadium the team sought out was constructed in this city.

Team News
The Wizards had been seeking sites for a soccer-specific stadium, initially targeting possible locations in Johnson County, Kansas. The Wizards' new ownership identified a site at 159th Street and U.S. Route 69 in south Overland Park, Kansas as its preferred location for a stadium, but this plan was met with numerous difficulties, namely the decision of the town's mayor to pull his support for the financing of the stadium after a vote had failed to secure money for the building of youth fields at the same site.

Due to renovations of Arrowhead Stadium, the Wizards were expected to play at a temporary stadium beginning in 2007, while planning and awaiting the construction of a new facility. Yet on January 31, 2007, it was announced the Wizards would continue to play in Arrowhead in the 2007 season.

The reasons given for the return to Arrowhead were the difficulties in expanding other facilities in the area (the KC Wizards played an exhibition in the beginning of the 2007 season at the District Activities Center owned and operated by the Blue Valley School District in Overland Park, Kansas) and the delay in the Arrowhead renovation plan.

On July 27, 2007, the Kansas City Star reported that Lane4 Property Group, a developer hired by the Wizards, was moving closer to making plans final for a massive redevelopment of now-vacant Bannister Mall that was intended to include a new 18,500-seat stadium for the Wizards and 12 to 18 tournament soccer fields. Under Lane4's plan, the Bannister Mall and Benjamin Plaza shopping centers and the adjoining Benjamin Ranch property would be demolished and replaced with a mixed-use project with retail, office and residential components in addition to a possible Wizards stadium. According to MLS.net on December 14, 2007, the Wizards plans for a new stadium were approved by the Kansas City council. The target date for completion of construction for a new facility had been stated as the beginning of the 2010 season. Team owners are currently collaborating with architecture firm 360 Architecture on the design of the new stadium.

Ultimately, due to the financial crisis among other issues, the Wizards plan failed in Missouri. The aforementioned stadium -- now known as Children's Mercy Park -- was built in Kansas City, Kansas, near Kansas Speedway and the ballpark.

Matches

Pre-season

Saturn Cup
The senior team played its first competitive match of the 2008 campaign in Norman, Oklahoma at John Crain Field on the campus of the University of Oklahoma on March 22, 2008 as part of the Saturn Cup against Real Salt Lake. The Wizards took home the hardware with the only goal of the contest coming from the head of defender Jimmy Conrad off a Carlos Marinelli free kick. This marked the second time in club history that it won the Saturn Cup.

New Mexico Cup
2008 Colombian newcomer Iván Trujillo scored twice against CSD Municipal the defending Liga Nacional de Guatemala champions in Albuquerque, New Mexico while the Wizards defense held the Reds scoreless, 2-0. The New Mexico Cup was played at the University of New Mexico.

Major League Soccer

Notes 

• Kansas City has now qualified for the playoffs in nine of their 13 seasons, both seasons since OnGoal bought the team in 2006.
• Kansas City finished the season 5-1-1 in their final seven matches, including a 3-0-0 record in their last three.
• Claudio López finished his first MLS season tied for second on the team in league goals (6) and tied for the team lead in assists (7).
• Davy Arnaud clinched the team Golden Boot after scoring two goals in his final two games.
• Five times throughout the season Kansas City scored three or more goals.
• Goalkeeper Kevin Hartman and defender Jimmy Conrad are the only Wizards to play all 2700 minutes this season.
• Hartman, Conrad and defender Michael Harrington are the only three players to start in all 30 MLS games.
• Hartman now has 138 career wins, an MLS all-time record.
• Kerry Zavagnin's final MLS appearance came away to the Revs in the season finale and was his 237th appearance for the Wizards, a club record. He finished with 20,516 minutes played in league play, also a club record.

Results summary

Results

Detailed Summary

MLS Cup Playoffs
 Thanks to the Wizards late season push they qualified as the 4th seed in the Eastern Conference Playoffs. The Columbus Crew, eventual MLS Cup 2008 Champions started their winning campaign in Kansas City. Despite creating very few chances the Wizards held a 1-0 lead over the Supporters' Shield holders late into the second half. The turning point in this first leg came in the 75th minute when Wizards midfielder Herculez Gomez was shown a straight red card reducing the club to 10 men and forcing them to protect their lead rather than extending it. Crew rookie Steven Lenhart found the equalizer in stoppage time sending the sold-out crowd home disappointed.
 The second leg held no drama as Brad Evans found the net for Columbus in the 7th minute and Robbie Rogers iced it in the 57th. The Wizards could only muster two shots on goal for the entire match, both of which were saved by former Wizard William Hesmer.

Results

Detailed Summary

U.S. Open Cup
 As a result of their 2007 final standing position the Wizards were forced to play the Colorado Rapids in a qualification round. The host Wizards, playing in a high school football stadium, jumped ahead with Ryan Pore's 20th minute tally. The Rapids fought back and were leading late 2-1 thanks to goals from Herculez Gomez (traded later in the season to the Wizards), and Jacob Peterson when Iván Trujillo knotted the score at two and send the game into overtime. 30 scoreless minutes lead to a penalty shootout which saw Colorado's fourth shot clank off the crossbar and Kurt Morsink put the Wizards through to the third round.
 The third round proved no easier as the Wizards went to Cary, North Carolina to face the USL-1 Carolina Railhawks. With the Wizards trailing 2-0 in the second half coach Curt Onalfo brought on Claudio López who netted the equalizer in the 82nd minute from the spot. Iván Trujillo provided the Wizards their first goal, and in extra time found the net again before Ryan Pore iced the tough fought game a minute before the final whistle. The Railhawks finished the match with nine men after Ryan Sole was shown his second yellow in the 89th minute and defender Chad Dombrowski was served a straight red in the 120th.
 The Quarterfinals saw the Wizards visiting the Seattle Sounders (USL) at Qwest Field. Neither team could score in the first 90 minutes forcing the Wizards into their third straight AET. Following 30 more minutes of scoreless action the two clubs found themselves in the PSO- Each club missed their chance in the second round and the shooters remained perfect until round 7 when defender Tyson Wahl's (Future Seattle Sounder himself) shot was saved. Zach Scott put him the winner and Kansas City's USOC run would end.

Results

Detailed Summary

Squad statistics

Final Statistics
*left club in season

Squad

First-team squad
As of OCT 25, 2008 

 (Captain)

Transfers

In

Out

References

Kan
Sporting Kansas City seasons
Kansas City Wizards
Kansas City Wizards